Harry Kincannon (July 26, 1909 – October 21, 1965), nicknamed "Tin Can", was an American Negro league pitcher in the 1930s.

A native of Northfork, West Virginia, Kincannon made his Negro leagues debut in 1931 with the Pittsburgh Crawfords. He played his first six seasons with Pittsburgh, and was selected to represent the club at the 1934 East–West All-Star Game. Kincannon went on to play for the New York Black Yankees and Washington Black Senators, then finished his career in 1939 by returning to the Crawfords, who had since moved to Toledo. He died in Beckley, West Virginia in 1965 at age 56.

References

External links
 and Baseball-Reference Black Baseball stats and Seamheads

1909 births
1965 deaths
New York Black Yankees players
Pittsburgh Crawfords players
Toledo Crawfords players
Washington Black Senators players
Baseball pitchers
Baseball players from West Virginia
People from Northfork, West Virginia
20th-century African-American sportspeople